Ronda Rudd Menlove (born March 18, 1952) is an American politician from Utah. A Republican, she was a member of the Utah House, representing the state's 1st house district in Box Elder County. She is Vice Provost of Utah State University.

Early life and career
Ronda Rudd married Martell Menlove and the couple had five children. She graduated magna cum laude from Utah State University in 1973 with a degree in Spanish and a minor in History, focusing in Latin American Studies. After graduating from Utah State University. Menlove attended Indiana University, where she worked as a Spanish Graduate Teaching Assistant. Menlove graduated with an M.S. in Secondary Education. She later earned her Ph.D. in Special Education from Utah State University in 1999.

Menlove has served as a teacher in the Granite School District, Tooele County School District, Rich County School District, and has held several positions at Utah State University since 1989 where she currently serves as the Vice Provost for Regional Campuses and Distance Education. She was elected to the Utah Legislature in 2004 and was re-elected to the Utah House in District 1 in 2006. Menlove has served as an Election Judge, and as a County and State Delegate to the Republican Party Convention and has served as a Utah State Representative since 2005.

Political career
During the 2013 and 2014 legislative sessions, Menlove served on the Social Services Appropriations Subcommittee, the House Health and Human Services Committee, the House Economic Development and Workforce Services Committee, the House Ethics Committee, and the House Rules Committee.  During the interim, she served on the Economic Development and Workforce Services Interim Committee and the Health and Human Services Interim Committee. Menlove also participated in the Child Welfare Legislative Oversight Panel and the Utah Constitutional Revision Commission.

2014 Sponsored Legislation

Menlove also floor sponsored:
 SB0008S01 Social Services Base Budget
 SB0042 Early Childhood Education
 SB0081S01 Permanent State Trust Fund Amendments
 SB0084 Amendments to Governor's Rural Boards
 SB0098 Paraeducator Funding
 SB0104 Improvement of Reading Instruction
 SB0126 Child Welfare Amendments
 SB0140 Advanced Placement Test Funding
 SB0255 Social Work Amendments

References

1951 births
Living people
Indiana University alumni
Utah State University alumni
Republican Party members of the Utah House of Representatives
Women state legislators in Utah
Utah State University faculty
Place of birth missing (living people)
People from Garland, Utah
21st-century American politicians
21st-century American women politicians
American women academics